Arnaldo Rosa Prata (10 April 1927 – 20 March 2022) was a Brazilian politician. A member of the National Renewal Alliance, he served as mayor of Uberaba from 1971 to 1973. 

Rosa Prata died in Uberaba on 20 March 2022 at the age of 94.

References

1927 births
2022 deaths
20th-century Brazilian politicians
Mayors of places in Brazil
National Renewal Alliance politicians
Brazilian Democratic Movement politicians
People from Uberaba